Conor Devitt (born 1995) is an Irish hurler and Gaelic footballer who plays for Wexford Championship club Kilanerin–Ballyfad. He has lined out with the Wexford senior teams in both codes on a number of occasions.

Career

Devitt first came to prominence as a dual player at juvenile and underage levels with the Kilanerin–Ballyfad club before eventually joining the club's top adult teams. He came on as a substitute when the club beat Ballyboughal to win the 2017 Leinster Intermediate Club Championship. Devitt first played at inter-county level during a two-year stint with the Wexford minor team before losing consecutive All-Ireland finals with the under-21 team. He was drafted onto the Wexford senior hurling team in 2015 before later making a number of appearances with the Wexford senior football team.

Honours

Killanerin-Ballyfad
Leinster Intermediate Club Football Championship: 2017
Wexford Intermediate Football Championship: 2017

Wexford
Leinster Under-21 Hurling Championship: 2014, 2015

References

1997 births
Living people
Irish schoolteachers
Wexford inter-county hurlers